Arjun Pandit is a 1999 Indian Hindi-language action crime film directed by Rahul Rawail and produced by N. R. Pachisia. It stars Sunny Deol and Juhi Chawla. The film is a remake of the 1995 Kannada language film Om and was the thirteenth highest-grossing film of 1999. The film is also remembered for its song Kudiyan Shehar Diyan, sung by Daler Mehndi and performed by Juhi Chawla.

Plot
Arjun Pandit is madly in love with Nisha, a beautiful model. He gets her kidnapped by his men and wants to celebrate her birthday, but she tells him that she hates him.

In the past, Arjun Dixit (Arjun Pandit) was a peaceful, God-loving man who lived in Haridwar. He is a professor at a university in Haridwar. One day, Nisha comes to his town to research Sanskrit language. Spending time with her, Arjun realizes that he is in love with her. She is also attracted to him, but sees him as a cowardly man because of his peaceful ways of dealing with roguelike Sanjay, who is the rogue son of a woman MLA, bullies Nisha. Nisha challenges Arjun to show his manliness to Sanjay. Angered by Nisha's challenge, Arjun beats Sanjay in black-and-blue in public. Filled with anger, Sanjay swore vengeance on Arjun for the humiliation. Sanjay and his friends attack Arjun and Nisha while they were joyfully spending time together. Arjun fights Sanjay and his friends; Nisha then throws Arjun a sword which results in Arjun stabbing and killing Sanjay. Police arrive in a matter of time, and Nisha tells the officer that Arjun has murdered Sanjay for his personal grudge. Arjun gets arrested, and this is when Nisha shows her true colors and testifies against Arjun creating a confusing situation. Nisha visits Arjun at the prison and reveals that her full name is Nisha Chopra and that she is the sister of Sangeeta Chopra, whom Arjun failed to save from the roguelike Sanjay who was a son of MLA. In a flashback, Arjun remembers witnessing one of his students, Sangeeta, being raped by Sanjay. He runs towards them to save her but is stopped by Sanjay's goons. After Sanjay leaves alongside his friends, Arjun quickly takes her to the hospital and goes to the police station to file a complaint. Still, Sanjay threatens to rape Arjun's sister if he testifies against him, persuading Arjun not to testify. Hearing that Arjun would not testify against Sanjay. Sangeeta is told by the police that if Arjun gives the statement, they will arrest and punish Sanjay, ensuing for Sangeeta to get justice. However, Arjun, the eyewitness, is forced to give the inappropriate statement because of Sanjay's blackmailing. The case is closed, leaving Sangeeta to burst into tears and urge her to get justice. Sangeeta is then harassed and abused by the majority of students at the college. She writes a letter to her sister Nisha about everything that happened to her, including that if Arjun Dixit had the courage to give the right statement, she would get justice and would be able to avoid the dirty misunderstandings of people. Lastly, she writes that she will never forgive Arjun, neither should Nisha. She immediately commits suicide after writing the letter.

Returning to the present, Arjun is found guilty and is behind bars for murder, but then Sanjay's mother bails Arjun out using her influences and tells him that her son was wrong and deserved what he got. Arjun's parents and Nisha had already left the city. Knowing that, Sanjay's mother offers Arjun a job, but he turns down the offer, telling her that he has to go Mumbai. Arjun then goes to Mumbai in search of Nisha. While staying with his friend Shiva, he meets Haldiraam, a hideous criminal who runs a powerful gang. Arjun finally finds Nisha dancing in a club. While he tried to approach her, he beats up a guy who was talking things about her in a vulgar way. The guy turned out to be the brother of a powerful don Ramu Kaalia in Mumbai, who is also one of Haldiraam's main rivals. Taking this advantage, Haldiraam kills the guy in the hospital, making Arjun believe that he himself was responsible for the death. Haldiraam tells Arjun that the don will kill him, so Arjun should kill him first. Haldiraam hands Arjun a gun and tells him to go kill the don. The attempt is a failure, but this makes Arjun become a ruthless, cold-blooded criminal known as "Pandit", because of his hidden knowledge and yoga skills.
Nisha is worried since Pandit is a strong criminal, and he might pose a threat to her and her family. She is at a photo shoot, her photographer, as well as her friend, Imran, notices her wrong posture and body language. She openly tells Imran that Arjun could harm her at any time and that she is worried, though she improves her posture and gets busy in the photoshoot until Pandit reaches there. Seeing that Nisha is wearing tight and revealing clothes, he forcefully covers her and takes her to her house. Nisha says Arjun has no right to change her lifestyle and that she will wear whatever she wants. Pandit sets Nisha's clothes on fire, leaving her raged. She decides to marry one of her childhood friends Siddharth in order to get away from Pandit. Pandit learns that Nisha is getting married, so he makes his way to the marriage and messes things up, taking Nisha with him. Though the police succeed in capturing Arjun and his men, but are threatened to stay still and not to shoot since Arjun was pointing a gun at Nisha. They take the jeep of the police and flee.
After too many ups and downs, Pandit forces Nisha to marry him by blackmailing her that he will kill her younger brother if she refuses. Nisha is forced to marry Pandit. Soon after they are married, Pandit emotionally laughs and says that in the past, he was also forced not to testify against Sanjay, or he would have raped his sister. Likewise, now, Nisha was forced to marry Pandit, or he would have killed her brother. Nisha starts realizing her wrongdoing. Later, Pandit allows Nisha to marry his friend Siddharth and start over. She is totally confused. Pandit takes her to Siddharth and apologizes for everything. While Pandit is returning to his car, he sees one of his man lying dead. This is when the situation turns out blood-filled and violent. Haldiraam's men are after both Nisha and Pandit. Pandit makes his way to save Nisha, and so he does. He beats all of Haldiraam's men and brutally kills Ramu Kaalia at the railway station. Haldiraam and other of his men are searching for Pandit and Nisha. The injured Pandit takes Nisha and hides underneath the railroad tracks. They both see love for each other. Haldiraam is unable to find them until the train goes away, disclosing their hideout. Haldiraam finds them and hurts Pandit at first, but when he speaks smuttily about Nisha, Pandit is enraged and beats up Haldiraam. Nisha successfully convinces Arjun Pandit not to kill Haldiram as she does not want to live for the rest of her life as Arjun's widow, and they needed Haldiram as a witness to present in court to prove Arjun's innocence. Nisha apologizes to Arjun, and Arjun forgives her. In the end, they unite forever and recall their student-teacher relationship and laugh.

Cast

 Sunny Deol as Prof. Arjun Dixit /Arjun Pandit : Nisha's Obsessive Lover and Husband . 
 Juhi Chawla as Nisha Chopra/Dixit/Pandit : Arjun's Obsessive Love Interest and Wife.
 Saurabh Shukla as Johnny
Virendra Saxena as Hafiz
 Annu Kapoor as Imran
 Ashish Vidyarthi as Haldiram
 Mukesh Rishi as Raman Kalia
 Shahbaz Khan as Sanjay Sharma : Sangeeta's Raper.
 Yashpal Sharma as Shiva
 Shashi Sharma as Minister
Deepak Qazir as Chopra , Nisha's father
 Sachin Khedekar as Dr.Siddarth
 Pallavi Kulkarni as Sangeeta Chopra : Nisha's Sister.
Aruna Sangal as Sangeeta's Mother and Arjun's Aunt

The film also stars Daler Mehndi in a special appearance.

Soundtrack
The soundtrack is composed by Dilip Sen-Sameer Sen, and songs are penned by Javed Akhtar. Song Kudiyan Sheher Diyan from these album was recreated for 2017 film Poster Boys.

Reception
Suparn Verma of Rediff.com wrote ″Rawail, who displayed excellent cinematic sense in  Arjun, does not highlight either his technical finesse or style in this film. The story outdated and the attempted twist in the tale does not work as it is in total variance Nisha's character and convictions.″

UP gangster Vikas Dubey was reported to be an ardent fan of this movie. He was rumoured to have watched it over 100 times. Inspired by his love for this movie, he had earned the monicker Pandit.

References

External links

1999 films
Films directed by Rahul Rawail
1990s Hindi-language films
1990s crime action films
Indian crime action films
Films about organised crime in India
Indian gangster films
Films scored by Dilip Sen-Sameer Sen
Hindi remakes of Kannada films
Films set in Mumbai
Films shot in Mumbai